Chronopappus is a genus of flowering plants in the daisy family.

There is only one known species, Chronopappus bifrons, native to the State of Minas Gerais in Brazil.

References

Monotypic Asteraceae genera
Vernonieae
Endemic flora of Brazil